Utah State Route 67 may refer to:

 The Legacy Parkway (State Route 67), a state highway in northwestern Salt Lake County and southwestern Davis County in northern Utah, United States
 Utah State Route 67 (1975-1991), a former state highway in northeaster Juab County, Utah, United States that ran northeasterly from SR-27 (now US-6) to Tintic Junction on SR-36
 Utah State Route 67 (1962-1969), a former state highway in St. George, Utah, United States that included the streets which surrounded Dixie Junior College (now Dixie State University)
 Utah State Route 67 (1931-1962), a former state highway on the northeastern edge of Tooele County and northwestern Salt Lake County in northern Utah, United States that ran from Lake Point Junction east to Salt Lake City

See also
 List of state highways in Utah
 List of highways numbered 67